Akaitiiti O Te Rangi Puna (born 5 September 1952) is a Cook Islands politician and member of the Cook Islands Parliament. She is a member of the Cook Islands Party. She is the wife of former Cook Islands Prime Minister Henry Puna.

Puna was born on Rarotonga and educated at Tereora College and at Auckland Girls' Grammar School in New Zealand. She began playing netball at school in New Zealand, and continued on her return to the Cook Islands, playing for Ngatangiia. She served as manager for Netball Cook Islands at the 1981 South Pacific Mini Games, and later served on its board. From 1972 she worked for Air New Zealand.

Following her husband's election as Prime Minister in the 2010 election Puna managed their pearl farm on Manihiki. When he retired in 2021 in order to take up the job of Secretary General of the Pacific Islands Forum she stood in his former seat of Manihiki in the resulting by-election, and was elected. She was sworn in as an MP on 31 May 2021.

She was re-elected at the 2022 Cook Islands general election.

References

Living people
1952 births
People from Rarotonga
People educated at Auckland Girls' Grammar School
Members of the Parliament of the Cook Islands
Cook Islands Party politicians
Cook Island women in politics
Cook Island sportswomen